The Ukrainian Women's Basketball SuperLeague is the top women's league of Ukrainian basketball. It was founded in 1992. It is run by the Basketball Federation of Ukraine (FBU). Before, the Ukrainian teams played in the championship of the USSR. During the seasons 1991/92-2009/10 called the Premier League.

History

Champions

Performance by club
Adelynn

See also
Ukrainian Basketball League

References

External links
Official Site 
Official Ukrainian Basketball Website 

Basketball leagues in Ukraine
Basketball
Ukraine
1991 establishments in Ukraine
league
Basketball
Professional sports leagues in Ukraine